Sample and Hold is a remix album from Simian Mobile Disco. It was released on 28 July 2008 on Wichita Recordings. The track listing resembles that of Attack Decay Sustain Release with the addition of a remix of "Clock", a track from Clock EP released in March 2008.

History
Each track of the album had been hand picked by James Shaw and James Ford, selected from remixes that have been made by DJs the duo encountered during their worldwide travels.

Track listing

 Sleep Deprivation (Simon Baker Remix) - 10:19
 I Got This Down (Invisible Conga People Remix) - 4:44
 It's The Beat (Shit Robot Remix) - 8:14
 Hustler (Joakim Remix) - 8:03
 Tits & Acid (Oscillation Remix) - 5:28
 I Believe (Pinch's 'I Believe in Bassline Therapy' Remix) - 5:10
 Hotdog (Cosmo Vitelli Remix) - 7:08
 Wooden (Danton Eeprom Remix) - 5:57
 Love (Beyond The Wizard’s Sleeve Remix) - 6:10
 Scott (Silver Apples Remix) - 4:11
 Clock (Chrome Hoof Remix) - 7:41

References

Simian Mobile Disco albums
Albums produced by James Ford (musician)
2008 remix albums
Interscope Records remix albums
Wichita Recordings albums